Schizodon intermedius is a fish in the family Anostomidae.

Description
Max length : 28.7 cm SL male/unsexed.

Distribution
South America:  Upper Paraná River basin.

References

Anostomidae
Taxa named by Júlio César Garavello 
Taxa named by Heraldo Antonio Britski
Fish described in 1990